Jill Judith Karofsky (born July 15, 1966) is an American attorney, judge, and justice of the Wisconsin Supreme Court. Karofsky served as a Wisconsin Circuit Court judge in Dane County from 2017 until her election to the Wisconsin Supreme Court.

Early life and career
Jill Karofsky was born on July 15, 1966, in south-central Wisconsin to Judy Karofsky, a former Middleton, Wisconsin, city council member and the city's mayor from 1975 to 1977, and her then-husband Peter Karofsky, a pediatrician. Karofsky was a state tennis champion while at Middleton High School, where she graduated in 1984. She later played Division I sports for Duke University, where she received her Bachelor of Arts in 1988. Karofsky received her Juris Doctor from the University of Wisconsin Law School in 1992.  She married attorney Jason Knutson in July 1998, though they later divorced.

Karofsky entered civil service as a deputy district attorney for Dane County. She has also served in the Wisconsin Department of Justice as Assistant Attorney General working as Wisconsin's Violence Against Women resource prosecutor, and later leading the Office of Crime Victim Services.

Judicial career 
In 2017, Karofsky was elected as a judge on the Dane County Circuit Court, beating municipal judge Marilyn Townsend by 15 points.

Three years later, Judge Karofsky challenged incumbent Wisconsin Supreme Court Justice Daniel Kelly in Wisconsin's 2020 election. Kelly had been appointed to the Supreme Court by Republican then-Governor Scott Walker in 2016 and was endorsed by President Donald Trump. Judge Karofsky was endorsed by over 100 current and former Wisconsin judges, including incumbent Wisconsin Supreme Court Justice Rebecca Dallet.  She also received endorsements from U.S. Senator Tammy Baldwin, former governor Jim Doyle, and former U.S. senators Russ Feingold and Herb Kohl. In the final days before the election, Judge Karofsky was endorsed by both the remaining 2020 Democratic Party presidential primary candidates—former Vice President Joe Biden and U.S. Senator Bernie Sanders.

The election set a spending record for any Wisconsin Supreme Court race, with the two candidates raising a collective $10 million.  During the campaign, Karofsky was the target of television attack ads funded by supporters of her opponent Daniel Kelly. The ads falsely claimed Karofsky, as deputy district attorney, struck a plea deal with a man charged with sexual assault of a minor resulting in no jail time. Karofsky was not placed on the case as a prosecutor until a year after the deal was struck. On March 27, 2020, Karofsky's campaign announced intent to file a cease and desist order against the ads. On April 6, 2020, Milwaukee County Circuit Judge Timothy Witkowiak blocked Karofsky's injunction against the ads on the grounds of unlawful prior restraint. The nonprofit fact checking site PolitiFact included the false claims against Karofsky it its yearly "Pants on Fire" review for 2020.

On April 13, 2020, Judge Karofsky was declared the winner of the election, taking roughly 55% of the vote. She took office on August 1, 2020, and became the ninth woman in Wisconsin history to serve on the state's high court. Karofsky's upset election has been cited by Tom Perez, the Democratic National Committee Chair, as being indicative of the results of the 2020 presidential election.

In keeping with her marathon hobby, on August 1, 2020, Judge Karofsky was sworn into office following the thirty-fifth mile of an "ultramarathon," by Wisconsin Supreme Court Justice Rebecca Dallet in a ceremony also attended by former governor Jim Doyle. She then ran another sixty-five miles.

2020 Presidential election cases
Karofsky voted with the majority of the Wisconsin Supreme Court to dismiss several of Donald Trump's appeals as he sought to challenge the results of the 2020 United States presidential election in Wisconsin.  As a result, she and Judge Rebecca Dallet, who also voted with the majority, were attacked in print and on social media with antisemitic and misogynistic comments and threats.  The attacks prompted the chief justice, Patience D. Roggensack, to issue a statement condemning the threats.

Personal life 
A single mother of two children (a son and a daughter), Karofsky lives in Middleton, Wisconsin. She is a marathon runner and Ironman triathlete.

Electoral history

Wisconsin Circuit Court (2017)

| colspan="6" style="text-align:center;background-color: #e9e9e9;"| General Election, April 4, 2017

Wisconsin Supreme Court (2020)

| colspan="6" style="text-align:center;background-color: #e9e9e9;"| Primary Election, February 18, 2020

| colspan="6" style="text-align:center;background-color: #e9e9e9;"| General Election, April 7, 2020

References

External links
 Jill for Justice (campaign website) (Archived 4/17/2020)
 Jill Karofsky at Our Campaigns
 
 

1966 births
Living people
20th-century American lawyers
20th-century American women lawyers
21st-century American judges
21st-century American lawyers
21st-century American women lawyers
21st-century American women judges
Duke University alumni
Justices of the Wisconsin Supreme Court
People from Middleton, Wisconsin
University of Wisconsin Law School alumni
Wisconsin lawyers
Wisconsin state court judges